Darius Dacian Ghindovean (born 1 November 2001) is a Romanian professional footballer who plays as a midfielder for Regionalliga West club Preußen Münster.

Career
He made his professional debut for MSV Duisburg in the 3. Liga on 20 June 2020, in the home match against Hansa Rostock. On 7 July 2020, he signed a one-year contract extension. The option for another year was used on 4 June 2021. In January 2022, he moved to Preußen Münster.

Career statistics

Honours
Preußen Münster
 Westphalia Cup runner-up: 2021–22

References

External links

2001 births
Living people
People from Mediaș
Romanian footballers
Association football midfielders
MSV Duisburg players
SC Preußen Münster players
3. Liga players
Regionalliga players
Romania youth international footballers
Romanian expatriate footballers
Romanian expatriate sportspeople in Germany
Expatriate footballers in Germany